Mírov is a municipality and village in Šumperk District in the Olomouc Region of the Czech Republic. It has about 300 inhabitants.

Geography
It lies in the Zábřeh Highlands. The Mírovka Stream flows through the municipality.

History
The first written mention of Mírov is from 1266. A medieval castle from the mid-12th century in Mírov was rebuilt into a Baroque fortress in 1684. It served as the occasional seat of the Olomouc archbishop until 1741, when it was looted by Prussian army. In 1750, the fortress was rebuilt into a prison. In 1850, the prison was bought by the state, a neo-Gothic reconstruction was carried out and a state prison was set up there.

From 1980 to 1990, Mírov was an administrative part of Mohelnice.

Economy
Today, the castle serves as a high-security and maximum security prison. With about 260 employers it is the main employer in Mírov.

Notable people
Karl Michael von Levetzow (1871–1945), German poet and librettist; died here
Hugo Sonnenschein (1889–1953), Austrian writer; died here
Štefan Tiso (1897–1959), Slovak politician and lawyer; died here
János Esterházy (1901–1957), Hungarian politician; died here

References

External links

Villages in Šumperk District